HMS Partridge was a 10-gun  built for the Royal Navy during the 1820s. She was sold in 1864.

Description
The ship's tonnage was 230 64/94 tons burthen. The Cherokee class was armed with two 6-pounder cannon and eight 18-pounder carronades. The ships had a crew of 52 officers and ratings.

Construction and career
Partridge, the second ship of her name to serve in the Royal Navy, was ordered on 28 October 1826, laid down in August 1828 at Pembroke Dockyard, Wales, and launched on 12 October 1829. She was completed on 24 April 1836 at Plymouth Dockyard.

On 6 June 1838 the ship arrived in Helgoland and was used to deport Harro Harring to Britain.

Notes

References

Rüger, Jan (2017) Heligoland Britain, Germany and the Struggle for the North Sea Oxford University Press. .

Cherokee-class brig-sloops
1829 ships
Ships built in Pembroke Dock